Harrisburg is an unincorporated community in Stark County, in the U.S. state of Ohio.

History
Harrisburg was laid out in 1827, and named after Harrisburg, Pennsylvania. A variant name was Barryville. A post office called Barryville was established in 1830, and remained in operation until 1906.

References

Unincorporated communities in Stark County, Ohio
Unincorporated communities in Ohio